Turkmensky District is an administrative district (raion), one of the twenty-six in Stavropol Krai, Russia. Municipally, it is incorporated as Turkmensky Municipal District. It is located in the north of the krai. Its administrative center is the rural locality (a selo) of Letnyaya Stavka. Population:  28,045 (2002 Census); 27,070 (1989 Census). The population of Letnyaya Stavka accounts for 17.1% of the district's total population.

Demographics

Ethnic groups

References

Notes

Sources

Districts of Stavropol Krai